Gene D. Phillips, S.J. (March 3, 1935 – August 29, 2016) was an American author, educator, and Catholic priest.

Life and career
Phillips was raised near Springfield, Ohio. He received his A.B. and M.A. (1957) degrees from Loyola University of Chicago, and a Ph.D. in English Literature from Fordham University in 1970. Phillips was a member of the Society of Jesus (the Jesuits), and was ordained a priest in 1965. His decision to become a Jesuit at age 17 was strongly affected by his viewing of the film The Keys of the Kingdom (1944) as a boy. Since 1970 Phillips had taught at Loyola University of Chicago. He had written or edited more than 20 books on filmmakers and film (see bibliography); several of these have been reviewed by major newspapers.

Phillips had served on juries at the Cannes, Berlin, and Chicago International Film Festivals. He had been a member of the editorial board for the journal Literature/Film Quarterly since its founding in 1973; this journal claims to be "the longest standing international journal devoted to the study of adaptation" (i.e. the adaptation of literature to film).  Phillips had been a prolific author of biographical books on filmmakers, and had published extended interviews with many filmmakers including Alfred Hitchcock,  Stanley Kubrick, Fritz Lang, and Joseph Losey. He was also a friend, champion and consultant for director Ken Russell, and author of the book Ken Russell (Twayne Publishers, 1979). Phillips was a consultant for The Devils (Russell, 1971) and famously defended the film against charges of blasphemy saying, in the documentary Hell On Earth - The Desecration and Resurection of The Devils (Mark Kermode, 2002), that the film depicts blasphemy, although it is not itself blasphemous.

Bibliography

 Reviewed by James F. Carens.

 Reviewed by Karen Jaehne. Subscription required.

 Reviewed by A. Mary Murphy.

(editor) 
(edited with Rodney Hill)  Reviewed by Richard Schickel.
 Reviewed by Richard Simon Chang.
(edited with Rodney Hill) 
 Reviewed by Gregory McNamee.
 Reviewed by Laurence Raw.

References

American film historians
American male non-fiction writers
20th-century American Jesuits
21st-century American Jesuits
Loyola University Chicago alumni
Loyola University Chicago faculty
Fordham University alumni
2016 deaths
1935 births